The Copa de la Reina de Baloncesto 2017 was the 55th edition of the Spanish Queen's Basketball Cup. It is managed by the Spanish Basketball Federation – FEB and was held between February 10 and 12, 2017.

Qualification
Prior to the start of the season, the rules of the Spanish Basketball Federation established that the three first teams classified at the end of the first leg of the 2016–17 Liga Femenina, together with the club representing the host province would play the Competition. If the host finished between the three first teams, the fourth classified would also participate.

However, on 15 November 2016, the Spanish Basketball Federation expanded the competition to the first six qualified teams at the half of the season, removing the spot for a host team. The two best teams will qualify directly to the semifinals while the other four teams will join the competition in the round of quarterfinals.

Qualified teams

Host City
On 21 December 2016, the Spanish Basketball Federation announced Girona as host city of the event.

Bracket

Final

References and notes

External links
Liga Femenina official website

2016
2016–17 in Spanish women's basketball
2016–17 in Spanish basketball cups